Johnnie Robert Wright Jr. (May 13, 1914 – September 27, 2011) was an American country music singer-songwriter, who spent much of his career working with Jack Anglin as the popular duo Johnnie & Jack, and was also the husband of country music star Kitty Wells.

Biography

Early life and career
Born in Mount Juliet, Tennessee, United States, Wright first performed with Anglin in 1936. On October 30, 1937, he married Kitty Wells. The two, along with Wright's sister Louise, performed as Johnnie Wright & the Harmony Girls. In 1939, Wright and Anglin formed the duo Johnnie & Jack. They teamed up full-time in the 1940s and, except for the time Anglin spent overseas during World War II, remained together for more than two decades.

In 1952, Johnnie & Jack's "Poison Love" took them to the Grand Ole Opry, where the duo, along with Wells, were invited to join and where they remained for 15 years. Following Anglin's death in an automobile accident in 1963, Wright continued performing and releasing records. After his name was misspelled on a record label, Wright changed his name from Johnnie to Johnny.

Johnnie Wright was a founding member of the Country Music Association and turned down the offer to be its first president. He was also involved in the effort to build the Country Music Hall of Fame. Although, Wright has not yet been inducted into the Hall of Fame.

In 1964, he and his Tennessee Mountain Boys had a Top 25 hit with "Walkin', Talkin', Cryin', Barely Beatin' Broken Heart." The following year, he had success with the Tom T. Hall-penned, "Hello Vietnam", a No. 1 hit. In 1968, he and Wells recorded an autobiographical duet, "We'll Stick Together", and continued playing live shows together through 2007.

Later years
In 1983, Wright and Wells opened the Family Country Junction Museum and Studio in their hometown of Madison, Tennessee. They closed the museum in October 2000, but their grandson, John Sturdivant Jr. kept the Junction Recording Studio operating.

Director Stanley Kubrick included Wright's song "Hello Vietnam" in the soundtrack for the 1987 film, Full Metal Jacket.

Wright joined producers Randall Franks and Alan Autry for the 1991 CD Christmas Time's A Comin''' featuring the cast of the TV series, In the Heat of the Night''. He performed along with Kitty Wells and Bobby Wright on "Jingle Bells", with the rest of the cast.

On December 31, 2000, the duo performed their farewell concert at the Nashville Nightlife Theater in Nashville, Tennessee. They played to a full house of fans, family and friends that included Ricky Skaggs, The Whites, Marty Stuart, Connie Smith, Leona Williams, Tommy Cash, Jack Greene, Jean Shepard and comedian-impressionist, Johnny Counterfit.

Personal life
Kitty Wells and Johnnie Wright were married on October 30, 1937. Together they had three children, Ruby (1939–2009), Bobby., and Carol Sue. Each of their children enjoyed minor success individually as recording artists. Ruby, with a hit called "Dern 'Ya," an "answer song" to Roger Miller's "Dang Me"; and Bobby, with a series of country-pop hits in the early to mid-1970s, including "Seasons in the Sun" (covering Terry Jacks' No. 1 pop hit from 1974). Carol Sue, on a mid-1950s duet with Wells, titled "How Far is Heaven". Carol Sue and Ruby also had success with a pop hit as The Wright Sisters with "That's Ok" in the early 1960s. All three children performed as part of their parents' road show, while growing up.

Johnnie Wright died at his home of natural causes in Madison, Tennessee on September 27, 2011, exactly two years after older daughter Ruby's death; and 33 days short of his 74th wedding anniversary with Wells. Wright had been in failing health for some time. He was survived by his wife of 73 years and their two surviving children Bobby and Carol Sue, plus eight grandchildren, 12 great-grandchildren, and three great-great-grandchildren.

Wright's widow Kitty Wells followed him in death less than ten months later on July 16, 2012.

Discography

Albums

Singles

References

External links

[ Biography of Johnnie & Jack on allmusic.com]
Johnnie Wright Interview NAMM Oral History Library (2004)
Johnnie Wright recordings at the Discography of American Historical Recordings

1914 births
2011 deaths
People from Mount Juliet, Tennessee
American members of the Churches of Christ
American country singer-songwriters
American male singer-songwriters
Country musicians from Tennessee
Decca Records artists
Grand Ole Opry members
Singer-songwriters from Tennessee